Bryan Alton Bennett (born March 6, 1992) is an American football quarterback who is a free agent. He played college football for the University of Oregon and Southeastern Louisiana University, and signed with the Indianapolis Colts as an undrafted free agent in 2015. He has also been a member of the Saskatchewan Roughriders and Winnipeg Blue Bombers.

Early life
Bennett was born in Los Angeles, California to Brian and Shyhra Bennett. He also has two sisters named Kristina and Hailey.

College career
Bennett committed to the Oregon Ducks on June 18, 2009 where he played for two years, until he transferred to Southeastern Louisiana.

College career statistics

Professional career

Indianapolis Colts

Bennett  signed with the Indianapolis Colts as an undrafted free agent on May 4, 2015  until he was released during final roster cuts on September 5, 2015.

Winnipeg Blue Bombers
He was later signed to the practice roster by the Winnipeg Blue Bombers on October 22, 2015.

Saskatchewan Roughriders
On November 28, 2016, Bennett signed with the Saskatchewan Roughriders (CFL). During the Riders 2017 training camp Bennett battled former NFL quarterback Vince Young and Canadian Brandon Bridge for the backup quarterback position behind veteran Kevin Glenn. Bennet was released by the Roughriders on June 17, 2017, as the team trimmed its roster down for the start of the season.

Winnipeg Blue Bombers (II) 
Bennett returned to the Winnipeg Blue Bombers when he signed with the team on May 24, 2018, at the start of training camp.

Saskatchewan Roughriders (II) 
Bennett was signed by the Saskatchewan Roughriders on June 17, 2019. He dressed in 17 regular season games as the short-yardage quarterback, attempting no passes, but rushed the ball 16 times for 69 yards and one touchdown. During the following off-season, on April 8, 2020, he was released.

Career statistics

References

External links

 
 Bryan Bennett at the Canadian Football League
 
 Southeastern Louisiana profile
 Oregon profile

1992 births
Living people
American football quarterbacks
American players of Canadian football
Canadian football quarterbacks
Indianapolis Colts players
Oregon Ducks football players
People from Encino, Los Angeles
People from Tarzana, Los Angeles
Players of American football from Los Angeles
Saskatchewan Roughriders players
Southeastern Louisiana Lions football players
Winnipeg Blue Bombers players